Nada que Perder (Nothing to Lose) (2008) is the twenty-seventh album by Mexican rock and blues band El Tri.

Track listing 
All tracks by Alex Lora except where noted.

 "Mi Beatle Favorito" (My Favorite Beatle) – 6:01
 "La Raza Indocumentada" (The Undocumented People) – 4:30
 "Nada Que Perder" (Nothing to Lose) – 3:40
 "Por Donde" (Which Way) – 4:31
 "Angel de La Guarda" (Guarding Angel) – 4:25
 "El Rocanrol Me Acompaña" (Rock 'n Roll Accompanies me ) – 2:07
 "Ya lo Se" (I Know It) – 4:00
 "Cuando Llueve" (When It Rains) – 4:41
 "Porque No Te Largas" (Why Don't You Go Away) – 4:31
 "Musico Callejero" (Street Musician) – 3:23

Personnel 
 Alex Lora – guitar, vocals, producer, mixing
 Rafael Salgado – harmonic
 Eduardo Chico – guitar
 Oscar Zarate – guitar
 Carlos Valerio – bass
 Chela Lora – backing vocals
 Ramon Perez – drums

Guest musicians 
Javier Aguirre – trombone
Arturo Labastida – saxophone
Esteban Reyes – trumpet

Technical
Angel Aguirre – graphic design
Craig Brock – engineer, mastering, mezcla, production assistant
Raúl Duran – assistant
Fernando Roldán – mixing

External links 
www.eltri.com.mx
Nada que Perder at MusicBrainz
[ Nada que Perder] at AllMusic

El Tri albums
2008 albums